Nicht Sprechen (German: Do Not Speak) is the first studio EP from New Orleans, Louisiana musician Thomas Buschbach, under the name Dying Machines. Nicht Sprechen was released on Mush Records on September 25, 2012.

Critical reception
The album was generally praised by critics. Jordan Richardson, writing for Blinded by Sound, stated:

Track listing
 "This, and Other Times"
 "Await You"
 "Leaf"
 "As a Day Fades"
 "Some Mistakes Are Bigger Than Others"

References 

2012 EPs